Turret Peak is a prominent rock peak, 2,790 m, standing 7 miles (11 km) northwest of Crosscut Peak in Millen Range. The peak is topped with a 10 m vertical spire, or tower, which is an excellent landmark. Turret Ridge extends northeast from the peak. Named for its distinctive appearance by the Southern party of NZFMCAE, 1962–63.

Mountains of Victoria Land
Pennell Coast